The Secret Orchard is a 1915 American drama silent film directed by Frank Reicher and written by Channing Pollock and William C. deMille. The film stars Cleo Ridgely, Blanche Sweet, Edward MacKay, Gertrude Kellar, Carlyle Blackwell and Theodore Roberts. The film was released on August 9, 1915, by Paramount Pictures.

Plot

Cast 
Cleo Ridgely as Cora May 
Blanche Sweet as Diane
Edward MacKay as Duke of Cluny
Gertrude Kellar as Helen, Duchess of Cluny
Carlyle Blackwell as Lt. Dodd
Theodore Roberts as Favereau
Cynthia Williams as Diane, age four
Marjorie Daw as Nanette
Loyola O'Connor as Nanette's mother
Sydney Deane as Nanette's father

References

External links 
 
 Lobby poster

1915 films
1910s English-language films
Silent American drama films
1915 drama films
Paramount Pictures films
American black-and-white films
American silent feature films
American films based on plays
Films based on British novels
Films based on adaptations
Films directed by Frank Reicher
1910s American films